(born 29 April 1977) is a J-pop singer who debuted in July 1999 with her single .

She is a Japanese acoustic pop artist and former rock singer. Her genre varies from rock, jazz, pop, and folk.

Albums

External links
Yano Maki Official Web Site
Buy Yano Maki Albums

References 

Cori Chan Lyrics
CD Tracks
CD Japan

Living people
1977 births
21st-century Japanese singers